Benthophilus leptocephalus is a deepwater species of goby widespread along the central Caspian Sea from the mouth of the Samur River to Türkmenbaşy and Hasan-Kuli.  This species can reach a length of  TL.

References

Benthophilus
Fish of Central Asia
Fish of Western Asia
Fish of the Caspian Sea
Endemic fauna of the Caspian Sea
Taxa named by Karl Kessler
Fish described in 1877